Frederick C. Hawes (January 22, 1875 - March 5, 1933)  served as a Republican in the California State Assembly for the 21st and 22nd district. During World War I he served in the United States Army. He was born in Waco, Texas on January 22, 1875, and died on March 12, 1933, from pneumonia.

References

United States Army personnel of World War I
Republican Party members of the California State Assembly
1875 births
1933 deaths